Oulens may refer to:

Oulens-sur-Lucens, Vaud, Switzerland
Oulens-sous-Échallens, Vaud, Switzerland